Massimo Sigala (born 7 January 1951) is an Italian former racing driver and co-founder of the Trident Racing.

References

External links
 

1951 births
Sportspeople from Messina
Living people
Italian racing drivers
IMSA GT Championship drivers
24 Hours of Le Mans drivers
World Sportscar Championship drivers

EuroInternational drivers